The Central Avenue Corridor is a significant stretch of north–south Central Avenue in Phoenix, Arizona. Roughly bounded by Camelback Road to its north, and McDowell Road to its south, this is one of Phoenix's most vital and heavily trafficked stretches of roads. It is also one of the region's largest centers of employment, with nearly 60,000 people being employed within a three-mile (5 km) radius of this swath of Central Avenue. Major employers here include major banks and financial institutions, hi-tech companies, and several significant law firms and government agencies.

This corridor bisects a larger area known as Midtown, Phoenix—the collection of neighborhoods north of downtown, and south of the North-Central and Sunnyslope areas. Block numbers or addresses for Central Avenue landmarks are indicated in parentheses where available.

Central Avenue Corridor today

Located halfway between the major arterial roads 7th Street and 7th Avenue, Central Avenue is the east–west dividing line for Phoenix as well as other Maricopa County cities that do not have their own addressing system.

Central Avenue crosses every economic stratum in Phoenix, rather abruptly in places. Downtown Phoenix land values are on par with other major cities. North of Midtown and Uptown Phoenix, the large, old homes in the tony North Central neighborhoods hark back to lower North Central Avenue's past. On the other side of the canal from North Central, at Central Avenue's dead-end, is the Sunnyslope District, founded in 1907. South of downtown, approaching South Mountain, the South Central area contains some of the most blighted neighborhoods in the city.

Central Avenue represents almost every architectural use and style found in Phoenix. Dilapidated and thriving strip centers, small old brick warehouses, industrial and commercial properties, single family homes and estates, and many of the city's high-rises all have Central Avenue addresses. On Central or in the immediate vicinity lie officially recognized and protected historic neighborhoods and a variety of cultural, performance, and sporting venues.

History

Pre–World War II

Central Avenue was originally named Center Street upon Phoenix's founding with the surrounding north–south roads named after Indian tribes.  The original Churchill Addition of 1877, covering a small area north of Van Buren Street to what is presently Roosevelt Street, was the first recorded plat showing Central Avenue with its present name.  Despite this, there is evidence of it being called Center Street into the 1930s. A replat of Phoenix's original townsite in 1895 was the first to officially show numbered streets and avenues starting from the east and west sides of Central.

Phoenix's first school was built on Center Street and Monroe in 1874 as a one-room adobe. A new four-room schoolhouse replaced it in 1879 as the fourth brick building in the city, and the school was expanded again in 1893. By 1919, the school had deteriorated considerably and was condemned and sold. The luxurious Hotel San Carlos, the first downtown hotel to feature air conditioning and elevators, opened on that spot in 1928 after a long delay. The Phoenix Indian School was established in 1891 giving Indian School Road (4100 N) its namesake. Near North Mountain, architect William Robert Norton subdivided the first parts of Sunnyslope in 1911 amidst a "squatters' community of asthmatics and tuberculosis patients" whose makeshift dwellings were illegal in the city proper.

By 1917, a mile-long bridge was open over the immense Salt River ultimately connecting downtown with South Mountain, then known as Salt River Mountain. The Westward Ho was constructed in 1927 and would remain the city's tallest building until 1960. Brophy College Preparatory (4701 N) opened for the first time in 1928 amidst agricultural fields. The Heard Museum (2301 N) opened in 1929 with little fanfare but would grow to be a highly respected institution of Native American culture and history.

1950s

As Phoenix sprawled north, developers found plenty of available land on Central Avenue and began capitalizing on the cachet of the youthful city's signature boulevard. Local steakhouse legend Durant's (2611 N) opened in 1950 and has changed little other than that patrons today enter the restaurant through the back off the parking lot as celebrities and other socialites once did back then. Park Central Mall (3110 N) replaced a dairy farm in the middle part of the decade, signaling the beginning of downtown's long decline as retail stores and malls opened away from the city center. America's second McDonald's restaurant was built near Indian School Road in 1953. It was the first McDonald's franchise, the first to feature the Golden Arches, and served as a model for Ray Kroc's Illinois store. These early commercial developments foreshadowed the trend towards autocentrism on Central Avenue and indeed the rest of the city. The first major high-rise built on Central Avenue outside of downtown was the Phoenix Towers (2201 N), erected in 1957. The Phoenix Art Museum moved to Central Avenue in 1959. Phoenix fully annexed Sunnyslope, at Central's north terminus, that year. Central Avenue to its southern terminus, South Mountain, where minorities had been historically redlined, was annexed a year later.

1960s

The 1960s brought a wave of high-rise development in Phoenix to Central Avenue that the city had hardly seen in its modern history.  In 1960 the Phoenix Corporate Center opened, which at  became the tallest building in Arizona. The first phase of the Rozenweig Center, known today as Phoenix City Square, was completed in 1964. Architect Wenceslaus Sarmiento's largest  project, the landmark Phoenix Financial Center (3443 N, better known by locals as the "Punch-card Building" in recognition of its unique southeastern facade) was also first finished in 1964 for banker and developer David Murdoch. Eight floors were added four years later. In addition to a number of other office towers, most of Phoenix's residential high-rises, such as the Landmark on Central (4750 N, then known as Camelback Towers), Executive Towers (207 W. Clarendon) and the Regency On Central (ROC) (2323 N, then known as Regency Apartments), were built during this decade.

1970s

In 1971, Phoenix cemented the precedent of previous ad hoc zoning decisions with the adoption of the Central Phoenix Plan, which envisioned unlimited building heights along Central Avenue. The new plan, however, did not sustain long-term development of the Central Corridor. Only a few office towers were constructed along North Central during this decade and none approached the scope of projects constructed during the previous decade. Instead, downtown resurged in popularity during the 1970s, witnessing a flurry of construction activity not seen again until the urban real estate boom of the 2000s.  In 1979, Phoenix adopted the Phoenix Concept 2000 plan which split the city into urban villages—each with its own village core where greater height and density is permitted, further shaping the free-market development culture.  Phoenix officially turned from its roots as a city built around its two main drags to a city of many nodes later connected by freeways. The cluster of high-rises north of Thomas Road became part of the Encanto village core.

1980s

Development on North Central Avenue began anew in the 1980s as part of that decade's real estate boom with a second wave of office towers. One Camelback was built in 1985 at the intersection of Central and one of Phoenix's other signature streets, Camelback Road. It is likely the last structure to be built that tall that far north, thus capping the build-out potential of the Central Avenue skyline almost five miles (8 km) from the origin downtown. The Phoenix Indian School was closed in 1988 and remained vacant for years.

1990s

Phoenix adopted the Arts District plan in 1992 in an attempt to interconnect lower Midtown's cultural amenities in a walkable area, but the private development that the plan anticipated never arrived, though  Burton Barr Central Library (1221 N) opened in 1995. The savings-and-loan boom that birthed new towers for Midtown Phoenix plagued it throughout the economic doldrums of the 1990s. Floorplans of office towers built in previous decades had become functionally obsolete and contributed heavily toward Midtown's high vacancy rates. Despite the recession, the swank Biltmore area surrounding 24th Street and Camelback Road began to eclipse the Central Corridor as the Phoenix metropolitan area's premiere office destination with mid- and low-rise developments such as the Camelback Esplanade. The 1990s were unkind to Central Phoenix's oldest section, and a renewed interest in the central city developed, focused on new residences instead of offices.

2000s

After numerous failed initiatives, Phoenix voters approved the Transit 2000 Regional Transportation Plan which dedicates a percentage of funds raised through a 4/10-cent (four cents on ten dollars) sales tax to build the METRO Light Rail line.  The  initial phase, which opened for service in late December 2008, runs from Christown Spectrum Mall, to Camelback, down Central, and then down Washington Street en route to Tempe and Mesa.  On Central Avenue, there are seven stops in Midtown  and Uptown Phoenix and three in downtown. The three-year construction process commenced in late 2005, with the final rail being laid in late April, 2008. 

The alignment of light rail down the center of Central permanently reshaped its physical layout and impacted the future of the surrounding neighborhoods. Light rail influenced growth as Phoenix adopted transit oriented development zoning standards in 2003 within 1/2 mile of stops, rendering an autocentric Central Avenue a thing of the past.

In Midtown, the market responded with two new mid-rise projects, the Artisan Lofts (1326 N), which opened in 2004 and the Tapestry on Central (2302 N), which opened in 2007.  Tapestry's construction brought down the second-to-last estate home in the Central Avenue Corridor; the 1917 Ellis-Shackelford House (1242 N) still remains north of Margaret T. Hance Park.

Capitalizing on its retro mid-1960s styling, Camelback Towers became the Landmark on Central in 2004, continuing a tradition of the city's few apartment towers becoming ownership condominia later on.  Also that year, Century Plaza  (3225 N), originally built in 1974 as offices, had a complete exterior and interior remodel as part of its conversion to condominiums.  As reconstruction continued, two additional floors were started in 2007. Century plaza is now known as "One Lexington".

Steele Indian School Park opened in November 2001 on the site of the old Phoenix Indian School five years after an intricate three-way land exchange involving the Barron Collier Company and the federal government.  In Phoenix, Collier received a  portion on the southwest corner of the site for long-term investment in addition to the Downtown block on which the Collier Center was built.

Gallery
The north and south sides of the Central Avenue Corridor of Phoenix are lined with historical houses and buildings. These are the images of those properties. Some are listed in the National Register of Historic Places and some are listed in the Phoenix Historic Properties Register. There are also some historic properties which are listed in both registers.

See also 

Phoenix Historic Property Register
List of historic properties in Phoenix
 Phoenix metropolitan area arterial roads
 Central City, Phoenix
 Encanto, Phoenix
 Phoenix City Square

References 

Phoenix Central Neighborhood Association

Transportation in Phoenix, Arizona
Neighborhoods in Phoenix, Arizona